The Blaxnit Cup, is a defunct club football competition which featured teams from both football associations on the island of Ireland, in a similar format to the later Setanta Cup. It was inaugurated in 1967 as a cross-border competition between clubs from the League of Ireland from the Republic of Ireland and the Irish League from Northern Ireland and ran until 1974. The competition was sponsored by Blaxnit, a sock and hosiery manufacturer based in Newtownards.

The competition featured four teams from each league. The Blaxnit Cup was the third cross-border competition. Previous competitions included the Dublin and Belfast Intercity Cup 1941/42-1948/49 and the North-South Cup 1961/62-1962/63.

After the demise of the Blaxnit Cup teams from both sides of the border continued to compete in the Texaco Cup 1973/74-1974/75, the Tyler Cup 1978-1980 and after 2005 in the Setanta Sports Cup.

The tournament suffered from lack of interest and security concerns.

Finals
Finals played over two legs except 1973–74, aggregate score given.

References

External links
 Irish Football Club Project Archive on All-Ireland Competitions
 Official Setanta Cup Site
 All-Ireland Cross-Border Cup Competitions history
 Irish League Archive - Blaxnit Cup

Defunct all-Ireland association football cup competitions
1967–68 in Republic of Ireland association football
1968–69 in Republic of Ireland association football
1969–70 in Republic of Ireland association football
1970–71 in Republic of Ireland association football
1971–72 in Republic of Ireland association football
1972–73 in Republic of Ireland association football
1973–74 in Republic of Ireland association football
1967–68 in Northern Ireland association football
1968–69 in Northern Ireland association football
1969–70 in Northern Ireland association football
1970–71 in Northern Ireland association football
1971–72 in Northern Ireland association football
1972–73 in Northern Ireland association football
1973–74 in Northern Ireland association football